Lac du Cinto is a lake in Corsica, France.

References

Lakes of Haute-Corse
Cinto